Marie-Noëlle Savigny (born 11 October 1957) is a French former athlete who specialized in the 100 meters hurdles.

Biography  
A bronze medalist 100 meters hurdles at the 1983 Mediterranean Games, Savigny placed sixth at the 1984 Olympics, at Los Angeles, in a time of 13.28s.

Prize list

Records

Notes and references

External links  
 Olympic profile for Marie-Noëlle Savigny at sports-reference.com

1957 births
Living people
French female hurdlers
Athletes (track and field) at the 1984 Summer Olympics
Olympic athletes of France
Sportspeople from Allier
Mediterranean Games bronze medalists for France
Mediterranean Games medalists in athletics
Athletes (track and field) at the 1983 Mediterranean Games